The 47th World Cup season began on 27 October 2012, in Sölden, Austria, and concluded on 17 March 2013, at the World Cup finals in Lenzerheide, Switzerland. The overall titles were won by Marcel Hirscher of Austria and Tina Maze of Slovenia.

A break in the schedule was for the biennial World Championships, held 4–17 February in Schladming, Austria. Changes for the 2013 season included the awarding of World Cup points for the slalom crystal globe for the limited field city events (parallel slalom), not just in the overall standings. Also, a crystal globe trophy was no longer awarded for the combined event, as many organizers considered the event difficult to market, but its results still counted in the overall rankings.

Maze became the first Slovenian to win an overall World Cup title; she clinched it on 24 February after her eighth victory of the season, a super-combined race at Méribel, France. Her victory in a downhill race at Garmisch-Partenkirchen in Germany on 2 March gave her wins in all five disciplines for the season, and she became the first racer in World Cup history to score more than 2,000 points in a single season. The previous record of 2,000 points was held by Hermann Maier, set during the 2000 season.

Maze broke various statistical records in this season, including the highest number of podiums in a season (24, record previously held by Maier (22) and by Hanni Wenzel and Pernilla Wiberg for ladies (18)), highest number of top 5 finishes (31, previously Maier and Wiberg (24)), highest number of points after first 10 races (677, previously Katja Seizinger, 643), largest percent of possible points won (69%, previously 61% by Wiberg), and the highest margin over the runner-up (1313, compared to 743 for Maier and 578 for Lindsey Vonn). Maze finished on podium in all giant slalom events, previously achieved only by Vreni Schneider in 1989. She is also the first woman to remain at the top of the overall standings throughout the season - a feat previously achieved only by Bode Miller in 2005. In addition to the overall title, Maze won the super-G and giant slalom titles, finished at the top of the combined list by winning both races in the season, and finished second in the downhill and slalom. Those titles went respectively to two Americans, Vonn and Mikaela Shiffrin. Vonn's season ended with a knee injury on 5 February at the World Championships, but she held on to win the downhill title by a single point after the final race was cancelled. Three days after turning 18, Shiffrin won the final slalom race at Lenzerheide on 16 March to overtake Maze and win that discipline's season title by 33 points.

The men's overall title wasn't decided until the World Cup finals at Lenzerheide. A runner-up finish in the giant slalom on 16 March gave Hirscher his second consecutive overall title, the first male to achieve this feat since Stephan Eberharter in 2002 and 2003. Hirscher also won the slalom title, while the downhill and super-G titles went to Aksel Lund Svindal of Norway, the sixth and seventh discipline titles for the former two-time overall champion. The giant slalom title went to American Ted Ligety, who won six of the eight GS races for his fourth season title in that discipline.

Calendar

Men

Ladies

Nation team event

Men's standings

Overall

Downhill

Super-G

Giant slalom

Slalom

Super combined

Ladies' standings

Overall

Downhill

Super-G

Giant slalom

Slalom

Super combined

Nations Cup

Overall 

Final standings after 69 races.

Men 

Final standings after 34 races.

Ladies 

Final standings after 35 races.

Footnotes

References

External links 
FIS-ski.com: Alpine skiing, FIS World Cup
FIS Alpine.com

 
Qualification events for the 2014 Winter Olympics
FIS Alpine Ski World Cup
World Cup
World Cup